Regina was a  federal electoral district in Saskatchewan, Canada, that was represented in the House of Commons of Canada from 1908 to 1935.

This riding was created in 1907  from parts of the former Northwest Territories ridings Assiniboia West and Qu'Appelle ridings. It initially consisted of a part of Saskatchewan stretching from the south boundary of the province.

The riding was abolished in 1933 when it was redistributed into Lake Centre, Qu'Appelle, and Regina City ridings.

Election results

By-election: On Mr. Motherwell's acceptance of an office of emolument under the Crown, 3 January 1922

By-election: On Mr. Darke's resignation, 20 February 1926 to create a vacancy for C.A. Dunning

By-election: On Mr. Dunning's acceptance of an office of emolument under the Crown, 5 October 1926

See also 

 List of Canadian federal electoral districts
 Past Canadian electoral districts

External links 
 

Former federal electoral districts of Saskatchewan